The Honda B20A engine series, known as the B20A and B21A was an inline four-cylinder engine family from Honda introduced in 1985 in the second-generation Honda Prelude. Also available in the contemporary third-generation Honda Accord in the Japanese domestic market, along with the Accord-derived Vigor, the B20A was Honda's second line of multivalve DOHC inline four-cylinder engines behind the "ZC" twin-cam variant of the ordinarily SOHC D-series, focused towards performance and displacing 2.0 to 2.1 litres.

The third-generation Prelude was exclusively powered by the B20A engine family and production of the B20A engine family ended with the conclusion of the production of the third-generation Prelude in 1991.

History
The B20A would be succeeded by the Honda B engine family. Although sharing similar nomenclature and some design elements, the earlier B20A substantially differs from the later B-series in architecture enough to be considered two different engine families and is also not to be confused with the B20B, a 2.0 liter DOHC engine introduced alongside the Honda CR-V in 1994.

There were two versions of the B20A:
 The first generation of B20A engines was available in the 83–87 Prelude 2.0SI in Japan and in Europe, the 86–89 Honda Vigor and Accord. It leaned towards the front of the car just like the A20A engine found in the same cars. This B20A produces  and  torque in Japan. In Europe this is called B20A1, producing  and 127 lb.ft (172 Nm).
 There was also a similar engine named B18A for the 86–89 Accords. It was a de-stroked B20A powered by two-sidedraft Keihin carbs.
 The second generation of B20A was found in the 87–91 Prelude. The 87–91 Prelude B20A and B21A blocks are cast so they lie at an 18-degree angle leaning towards the firewall. This was done to please the exterior specifications for the 1988–1991 3rd Generation Prelude due to its ultra-low hood line which Honda dubs the "engineless design" and also for handling reasons; placing the engine at an angle gives it a lower center of gravity (similar to straight 6 designs in older BMW's).

The B20A, B20A3, and B20A5 engines consisted of closed-deck aluminium blocks with thicker-than-average iron sleeves whereas the B21A1 had FRM (fiber reinforced metal) cylinder liners.

The external block dimensions had to stay identical (although there was increased external strengthening and webbing on the B21) to the B20A5 block so Honda called upon Saffil to create a thin but strong cylinder liner using FRM (fiber reinforced metal) which consisted of a carbon fiber matrix, aluminium alloy, and aluminium oxide to make a very strong cylinder sleeve. The sleeve is so strong, in fact, that it wears out the piston rings, causing low compression numbers, severe smoking, and high oil usage. It is possible in many situations to merely replace the worn rings in order to revive the motor's former output. Many machine shops will not attempt to re-hone or re-bore the FRM sleeves, as this type of sleeve will de-laminate during machining operations.

B20A, B20A1
(16-Valve, 4 Cylinder, DOHC, PGM-FI)
 "Honda" logo in center of valve cover – Filler cap on left side of cover.
 Found in:
 Serial numbers 1000001~, 1500001~ and 1550001~
 1985–1987.03 Honda Prelude Non-U.S.
 1985.06–1987.04 Honda Accord Non-U.S.
 1985.06–1987.04 Honda Vigor Non-U.S.
 Serial numbers 1600001~ and 1640001~
 1987.05–1989.08 Honda Accord Non-U.S.
 1987.05–1989.08 Honda Vigor Non-U.S.
 Displacement: 1958 cc
 bore: 
 stroke: 
 Compression: 9.4:1
 Power:
 (JDM GOLD TOP B20A 1985.06–1987.04)  at 6300 rpm & 137 lb.ft (186 N·m) at 5000 rpm (!JIS Gross data), using PH3 ECU
 (JDM BLACKTOP B20A 1987.05–1989.08)  at 6200 rpm & 127 lb.ft (173 N·m) at 4000 rpm (!JIS Net data with new dual-stage intake manifold), using PH3 ECU
 (EDM, B20A1 Gold Top)  at 6000 rpm & 127 lb.ft (172 N·m) at 4000 rpm, using PJ5 (602,603,752), PJ7, PH3 ECU w vac. advance
 Transmission: B2K5(86–87), F2K5(88–89)

The B20A installed in 1988–1991 Preludes have the following specifications:

(16-Valve, 4 Cylinder, DOHC, PGM-FI)
 Found in:
 1987–1991 Honda Prelude 3rd gen Non-U.S.
 Power:  at 6000 rpm
 Torque: 128tq at 4500 rpm
 Compression ratio: 9.4:1

B20A2
(16-Valve, 4 Cylinder, DOHC, PGM-FI)
 Found in:
 1987–1989 Honda Accord (CA5), Europe
 Power:  at 6000 rpm

B20A3
(12-valve, SOHC, dual side-draft carburetors)
 Found in:
 1987–1990 Honda Prelude 3rd gen 2.0 S
 Power:  at 5800 rpm (MT) with catalytic converter,  at 5800 rpm without catalytic converter
 Torque:  at 4000 rpm
 It was PGM-CARB microprocessor controlled (pk-1)

B20A4
(12-Valve, SOHC, dual side-draft carburetors)
 Found in: 1987–1991 Honda Prelude 3rd gen Non-U.S.
 Fuel system:  2 carburetors 
 Displacement (cm3):  1958 
 Bore x Stroke (mm):  81 x 95 
 Compression ration:  9.2:1
 Maximum power:  114 hp at 5800 rpm 
 Maximum torque: 116 ft lb at 4500 rpm 
 Catalytic converter:  no
 ECU: no

B20A5
(16-valve, DOHC, PGM-FI)
 Found in:
 1987–1991 Honda Prelude 3rd gen 2.0Si
 Power:  at 6200 rpm
 Torque:  at 4000 rpm
 Engine cc: 1958.14
 Cylinder cc: 489.535
 Deck cc: 13.885
 Head cc: 47.3
 Compression Ratio: 9.0:1

B20A6
(16-Valve, DOHC, PGM-FI)
 Found in:
 1987–1991 Honda Prelude 3rd gen Non-U.S. and Australian Domestic Market
 at 6000 rpm
174 Nm at 4500 rpm
KY model is one of them

B20A7
(16-Valve, DOHC, PGM-FI)
 Found in:
 1987–1991 Honda Prelude 3rd gen Non-U.S. UK, France, Holland, Norway, South Africa, New Zealand
 Power  at 6000 rpm
 Torque 132tq (180 Nm) at 5500rpm
 Compression ratio 10.5:1
 Bore 81 mm
 Stroke 95 mm
 Engine capacity 1958 cm3 or 119.5 cu-in

B20A8
(16-Valve, DOHC, PGM-FI)
 Found in:
 1987–1991 Honda Prelude 3rd gen Non-U.S. Russian, Swedish Domestic Market
 1988–1989 Honda Accord Non-U.S.
 Power  at 6000 rpm

B20A9
(16-Valve, 4Cylinder, DOHC, PGM-FI)
 Found in:
 1990–1991 Honda Prelude 3rd gen Non-U.S. Finland, Germany, Norway, Netherlands, Russia, Argentina
 Power  at 6000 rpm
 Torque 129tq (175 Nm) at 4500 rpm
 Cylinder cc: 489.535
 Deck cc: 13.885
 Head cc: 47.3
 Compression ratio 9,3:1

B21A
(16-valve, DOHC, PGM-FI)
 Found in:
 1990–1991 Honda Prelude 3rd gen Si States
 Very rare, it was only produced for the "Si States" models in Japan
 Power: 
 Torque: 186 N·m (137 lb·ft)
 Compression Ratio: 9.4:1 
engine using a pk-3 honda ECU

B21A1
(16-valve, DOHC, PGM-FI)
 Found in:
 1990–1991 Honda Prelude 3rd gen SI USDM
 1990–1991 Honda Prelude 3rd gen SR Canadian Market
 Power:  at 5800 rpm
 Torque:  at 5000 rpm
 Engine cc: 2056.03
 Bore 83 mm
 Stroke 95 mm
 Cylinder cc: 514.0075
 Deck cc: 10.191
 Head cc: 51.0
 Compression Ratio: 9.4:1

See also
 List of Honda engines
 Everything Prelude! Pictures, write-ups, product reviews...
 PreludePower.com
 3Geez.com

Sources

 3rd gen Honda Prelude Engine's specification
 3rd Generation Honda Prelude Engine Stats

B20A
1985 introductions
Straight-four engines